Suncrest may refer to:

Suncrest, Washington, a small unincorporated community in Stevens County, Washington, United States
Suncrest, West Virginia

Sun Crest may refer to:

Sun Crest, a brand of orange-flavored soft drinks